The 2004 United States presidential election in Utah took place on November 2, 2004. It was part of the 2004 United States presidential election. Voters chose five representatives, or electors to the Electoral College, who voted for president and vice president.

Utah was won by incumbent President George W. Bush by a 45.5% margin of victory. Prior to the election, all 12 news organizations considered this a state Bush would win, or otherwise considered as a safe red state. It is a strongly Republican state and has supported the party’s nominee in every presidential election since 1968. With 71.54 percent of the popular vote, Utah was Bush's strongest state in the 2004 election.

This was the first of four instances in which a presidential candidate gained over 70% of a state's vote after Ronald Reagan's 1984 landslide. The others are Mitt Romney in Utah in 2012 and Barack Obama in Hawaii in 2008 and 2012. These last three all involved a candidate with a close tie to the state: Barack Obama was born in Hawaii, and Mitt Romney, as the first Mormon on a major-party presidential ticket, was popular in Mormon-majority Utah and would later represent the state in the United States Senate.

Primaries
 2004 Utah Democratic presidential primary

Campaign

Predictions
There were 12 news organizations who made state-by-state predictions of the election. Here are their last predictions before election day.

 D.C. Political Report: Solid Republican
 Associated Press: Solid Bush
 CNN: Bush
Cook Political Report: Lean Republican
 Newsweek: Solid Bush
New York Times: Solid Bush
 Rasmussen Reports: Bush
 Research 2000: Solid Bush
Washington Post: Bush
Washington Times: Solid Bush
Zogby International: Bush
 Washington Dispatch: Bush

Polling
The final three polls averaged Bush with 67 percent to Kerry with 25 percent.

Fundraising
Bush raised $561,645. Kerry raised $262,031.

Advertising and visits
Neither campaign advertised or visited this state during the fall election.

Analysis
Republicans dominate Utah state politics because of the very high Mormon population that accounts for almost seventy percent of the residents throughout the state. Mormons have been known for having very conservative values. While every county voted for Bush, areas such as Summit County (ski resort), Moab (becoming an outpost for environmental activists), Carbon County (largely blue collar), Salt Lake City (urban area with some diversity) and San Juan County (economically distressed and mostly Native American) did give a somewhat greater proportion of their votes to Kerry. However, other areas were uniformly Republican in voting. Utah County's (home of Provo and Brigham Young University) Republican vote (86%) was by far the largest percentage of any county its size in America.

Results

Results by county

Results by congressional district
Bush won all 3 congressional districts, including one held by a Democrat.

Electors

Technically the voters of Utah cast their ballots for electors: representatives to the Electoral College. Utah is allocated five electors because it has three congressional districts and two senators. All candidates who appear on the ballot or qualify to receive write-in votes must submit a list of five electors, who pledge to vote for their candidate and his or her running mate. Whoever wins a plurality of votes in the state is awarded all five electoral votes. Their chosen electors then vote for president and vice president. Although electors are pledged to their candidate and running mate, they are not obligated to vote for them. An elector who votes for someone other than his or her candidate is known as a faithless elector.

The electors of each state and the District of Columbia met on December 13, 2004, to cast their votes for president and vice president. The Electoral College itself never meets as one body. Instead the electors from each state and the District of Columbia met in their respective capitols.

The following were the members of the Electoral College from the state. All 5 were pledged to Bush/Cheney:
Olene S. Walker
 Gayle McKeachnie
 Lewis K. Billings
Joseph A. Cannon
 Scott F. Simpson

See also
 United States presidential elections in Utah
 Presidency of George W. Bush

References

Dave Leip’s U.S. Election Atlas
Official 2004 Utah General Election Results

Utah
2004
Presidential